Break Free may refer to:

Film and television
 Break Free (TV series), a 2013 Malaysian television series
 Break Free (film), a 2003 Italian romance-comedy drama film
 Break Free, a short film by Ruby Rose

Music

Albums
 Break Free - Treasure Isle Classics, 2006 reggae album by Mike Brooks
 Break Free, 2015 debut double album by Eldie Anthony

Songs
 "Break Free" (song), 2014 song by Ariana Grande
 "Break Free", 1994 song by The Kelly Family
 "Break Free", 1992 song by the band Europe, the B-side of "I'll Cry for You"
 "Break Free (Lead the Way)", the ending theme song for the video game Super Mario Odyssey

See also
 Breaking Free (disambiguation)
 "I Want to Break Free", 1984 song by Queen